The Arabian Nights Murder, first published in 1936, is a detective story by John Dickson Carr featuring his series detective Gideon Fell.  This novel is a mystery of the type known as a whodunnit.

Plot summary

When Scotland Yard detective John Carruthers attends the Wade Museum of Oriental Art, and begins to investigate the interior of one of a series of carriages on exhibit, he is sarcastically told by the night watchman "Watch out when you touch it!  There's a dead man inside!"  Of course, a dead man tumbles out.  The corpse has been stabbed with an elaborate Persian dagger, is wearing an obvious set of false whiskers, and is clutching a cookbook.  Gideon Fell must investigate the death and explain all the bizarre circumstances of what was a very busy night at the museum.

1936 American novels
Novels by John Dickson Carr
Hamish Hamilton books
Harper & Brothers books